Zonocerus elegans is a species of gaudy grasshopper in the family Pyrgomorphidae.

Subspecies
These subspecies belong to the species Zonocerus elegans:
 Zonocerus elegans angolensis Kevan, 1972
 Zonocerus elegans elegans (Thunberg, 1815)

References

External links

 

Pyrgomorphidae